Mordellistena binhana is a beetle in the genus Mordellistena of the family Mordellidae. It was described in 1926 by Maurice Pic.

References

binhana
Beetles described in 1926